A cabin motorcycle is a fully  or semi-enclosed motorcycle. They first appeared in the 1920s In parts of Eastern Europe, they are known as dalniks.

These fully enclosed non-production motorcycles used for land-speed record-breaking attempts, such as the NSU Delphin III, are known as streamliners.

Manufacturers and models

Fully-enclosed
 Acabion
 Lit Motors – C-1 (development prototype)
 Peraves – Ecomobile, MonoTracer, E-Tracer, Zerotracer (Monotracer launched 1982, approx. 150 sold to 2014, E-Tracer available afterwards)

Semi-enclosed
 BMW Motorrad – C1 (produced 2000-2002, over 12,600 sold)
 Benelli Adiva
 Honda – Gyro Canopy (in continuous production since 1990, 62,000 sold as of 2002)
 Quasar (produced 1975-1982, approx. 22 sold)
 The Auto Moto

References

External links
"dalniks" & cabin motorcycles
History of Cabin motorcycle(Czech)

Motorcycle classifications